Peter Dobson (born 21 December 1962) is a Canadian former swimmer. He competed in the men's 400 metre individual medley at the 1984 Summer Olympics.

References

External links
 

1962 births
Living people
Canadian male medley swimmers
Olympic swimmers of Canada
Swimmers at the 1984 Summer Olympics
Pan American Games competitors for Canada
Swimmers at the 1983 Pan American Games
Universiade medalists in swimming
Sportspeople from Peterborough, Ontario
Universiade silver medalists for Canada
Medalists at the 1981 Summer Universiade
20th-century Canadian people